The Varanasi–Bareilly Express is an Express train belonging to Northern Railway zone that runs between  and  in India. It is currently being operated with 14235/14236 train numbers on a daily basis.

Service

The 14235/Varanasi–Bareilly Express has an average speed of 38 km/hr and covers 559 km in 14h 45m. 14236/Bareilly–Varanasi Express has an average speed of 37 km/hr and covers 559 km in 15h 15m.

Route and halts 

The important halts of the train are:

Coach composition

The train has standard ICF rakes with max speed of 110 kmph. The train consists of 15 coaches:

 1 AC First-class
 1 AC II Tier
 3 AC III Tier
 5 Sleeper coaches
 4 General

Traction

Both trains are hauled by a Lucknow Loco Shed-based WDM-3A diesel locomotive from Bareilly to Varanasi and vice versa.

See also 

 Varanasi Junction railway station
 Bareilly Junction railway station
 Bhagmati Express

Notes

External links 

 14235/Varanasi - Bareilly Express
 14236/Bareilly - Varanasi Express

References 

Passenger trains originating from Varanasi
Trains from Bareilly
Express trains in India